Crab soccer (American English and Australian English), or crab football (British English), is an informal sport, derived from soccer played by two teams, commonly in physical education classes. As with regular soccer, the objective is to kick an inflated ball into a goal to score the most points. Unlike soccer, players support themselves on their hands and move with their feet, in motions that make them look like crabs, a method known as crab walking. Crab soccer may be played outdoors or in a gymnasium, and is more commonly thought of as being a sport played by children. The game can be played with a regular soccer ball, but is often played with a cage ball.

There are various sets of rules. This sport involves kicking, so safety is at the root of many rules. Like soccer, players other than the goalkeeper must not touch the ball with their hands. No players may stand except for the goalkeeper.

References

External links
Education site
Crab Soccer at Everything2

Ball games
Association football variants